Alessio Eraldo Bruno (born 24 January 1994) is an Italian footballer who plays for Tonara.

Biography
Born in Olbia, Sardinia, Bruno started his career at hometown club Olbia. He was the member of Giovanissimi under-15 team in 2007–08 season. He also represented Sardinia regional Giovanissimi representatives in Coppa Nazionale Primavera. Sardinia finished as the second in the group, thus Friuli – Venezia Giulia qualified for the semi-finals.

Bruno was the member of Olbia's Allievi Under-17 team in 2009–10 season. Bruno also made his first team debut on 9 May 2010, the last match of 2009–10 Lega Pro Seconda Divisione. He replaced Alessandro Esposito in the second half. The team folded at the start of 2010–11 season.

In summer 2010 Bruno joined Serie B club Vicenza Calcio. Bruno remained in the Allievi National League in the first season. Bruno became the member of the reserve from 2011 to 2013 (U20 event until 2012, U19 since 2012). The club also sold Bruno to Pescara on 29 June 2012, the second last day of 2011–12 financial year, after Vicenza had relegated to the third division. However the sale of 50% registration rights of Bruno for €400,000 would only for the 50% registration rights of Andrea Cappa, which also priced for €400,000. Vicenza and Pescara made financial benefit in the swap deal as well as in the football field.  Bruno immediately returned to Vicenza in temporary deal as well as Di Pentima also returned to Pescara in temporary. Bruno was awarded no.20 shirt of the first team but did not play. In June 2013 the four co-ownership deals between Vicenza and Pescara were renewed.

Bruno was awarded no.37 shirt of Pescara first team in 2013–14 season.

Footnotes

References

External links
 The Guardian stats. centre
 Football.it Profile 

1994 births
Footballers from Sardinia
People from Olbia
Living people
Italian footballers
Association football midfielders
Olbia Calcio 1905 players
L.R. Vicenza players
Delfino Pescara 1936 players
Serie C players